Al-Suqaylabiyah is a Greek Orthodox Christian Syrian city administratively belonging to Hama Governorate. Al-Suqaylabiyah is located at a height of 220 meters above sea level. According to the 2004 official census, the town has a population of 17,313.

History
The name goes back to the ancient Seleucia ad Belum, a town of Hellenistic foundation that was located almost at the same place. The site was given up during the Middle Ages and repopulated at the beginning of the 19th century. In 1860 local Bedouin tribes attacked al-Suqaylabiyah.

In July 2020, the Syrian government announced a plan to build a replica of the Hagia Sophia in Al-Suqaylabiyah with Russian assistance as a reaction to its transformation into a mosque by Turkish authorities.

References

Bibliography

Cities in Syria
Populated places in al-Ghab Plain

Populated places in al-Suqaylabiyah District
Eastern Orthodox Christian communities in Syria
Christian communities in Syria